Lin Ling-san (16 April 1944 – 26 November 2022) was a Taiwanese politician. He served as Minister of Transportation and Communications from 2002 to 2006. In 2009 the Control Yuan voted to impeach Lin for illegally investing in the Taiwan High Speed Rail Corp. The China Post reported that, "Because Lin [was] no longer a government official, the impeachment [would] not have any direct consequences for him, but the ruling [could] serve as a warning to incumbent officials dealing with the high-speed railway."

References

1944 births
2022 deaths
Taiwanese Ministers of Transportation and Communications
Politicians of the Republic of China on Taiwan from Kaohsiung
Deputy mayors of Taichung
Northrop University alumni
Feng Chia University alumni